Moscow, the capital and largest city of Russia, is home to 12,719 completed high-rises, 22 of which stand taller than . The tallest building in the city is the 101-story East Tower of the Federation Tower complex, which rises  in the Moscow International Business Center (MIBC) and was completed in 2016. The Federation Tower was the tallest building in Europe upon its completion, and remained the tallest building until 5 October 2017 when it was surpassed by the Lakhta Center in Saint Petersburg, Russia. The second, third, and fourth-tallest buildings in Moscow are the South Tower of OKO, Neva Towers 2, and the Mercury City Tower, respectively, with OKO and Mercury City Tower also held the position of the tallest building in Europe.

The first skyscrapers to be completed in Moscow are the Stalinist-style Seven Sisters, designed between 1947 and 1953. Among them, the Kotelnicheskaya Embankment Building and the main building of Moscow State University became the tallest buildings in Europe respectively, from 1952 to 1990, when it was surpassed by the Messeturm in Frankfurt, Germany. In 1992, the Moscow government conceived the MIBC as a new business district for the city, and would culminate in becoming the center where many of Europe's tallest buildings would be built. In 2005, the Triumph Palace (not in the MIBC) surpassed the Commerzbank Tower in Frankfurt as the tallest building in Europe until almost two years later. From 2007 to 2017, skyscrapers based in the MIBC would continuously succeed each other as the tallest building in Europe (with the exception of The Shard based in London, United Kingdom from 2011 to 2012).

Several new skyscrapers that were completed since 2017 include the Neva Towers and Nebo. Skyscrapers that are under construction as of January 2021 include the Capital Towers and the Grand Tower, as well as the One Tower, which is set to become the city's tallest building.

Tallest buildings 
This height includes spires and architectural details but does not include antenna masts. An equal sign (=) following a rank indicates the same height between two or more buildings; they are listed in order of floor count, then alphabetically.

Tallest under construction 
This lists buildings that are under construction in Moscow and are planned to rise at least 120 metres (394 ft). Any buildings that have been topped out but are not completed are also included.

Timeline of tallest buildings
This is a list of buildings that once held the title of tallest building in Moscow.

See also
List of tallest structures built in the Soviet Union

Notes
A. This structure is not a habitable building but is included in this list for comparative purposes. Per a ruling by the Council on Tall Buildings and Urban Habitat, freestanding observation towers, chimneys or masts are not considered to be buildings, as they are not fully habitable structures.

References 

 
Moscow
Moscow-related lists
Tallest buildings